Tripp Vinson is an American film and television producer, best known for his films Baywatch, San Andreas, Journey 2: The Mysterious Island, The Guardian, The Number 23, Red Dawn, and Hansel & Gretel: Witch Hunters. 

The New York Times described Vinson as a "a journeyman producer who specializes in popcorn flicks" who is good at getting films produced and quickly adapting to shifting trends. His collective films have grossed over $1.5 billion.

Vinson was a longtime producing partner of Beau Flynn. The pair split in June 2011.

In 2012, Vinson was engaged to William Morris Endeavor's agent Adriana Alberghetti.

In 2015, it was announced that he was producing a live-action prequel to Aladdin, titled Genies.

In March 2016, it was announced that Vinson was set to produce a spin-off of Snow White and the Seven Dwarfs titled Rose Red.

Vinson's bachelor party in Las Vegas was indirectly the basis for the story of the 2009 comedy film The Hangover.

Filmography

References

External links
 

Living people
American film producers
American television producers
Year of birth missing (living people)